The Setesdal Line was a railway between Kristiansand and Byglandsfjord in southern Norway,  long. Stations along the line included Mosby, Vennesla, Grovene (Grovane), Iveland and Hægeland.

Today, only the stretch between Grovane and Røyknes of the original line is preserved as a heritage railway.

History 
When the standard gauged Sørlandet Line was opened to Kristiansand in 1938, Grovane became the new terminal station for the Setesdal Line, with connection to the Sørlandet Line.

The Setesdal Line was suspended from 1 September 1962, and the track was lifted between Byglandsfjord and Beihølen. The  line between Beihølen and Grovane was, however, preserved by local enthusiasts. The Setesdal Line Hobby Club was already established in 1964.

Today, the Setesdal Line is a railway museum with steam trains serving the  line between Grovane and Røyknes. Four steam locomotives from 1894-1902 are preserved, along with a number of passenger and freight cars.

The preserved locomotives

Narrow gauge steam locomotives 

Class XXI number 1, built at Dübs and Company in 1894.
Class XXI number 2, built at Dübs and Company in 1894.
Class XXI number 5, built at Thunes Mekaniske Værksted in 1901.
Class XXII number 6, built at Thunes Mekaniske Værksted in 1902.

Narrow gauge diesel locomotives 
SJ Class Z4t number 227, built in 1950. Bought from the SJ in 1976.
SJ Class Z4t number 307, built in 1952. Bought from the SJ in 1981.

Narrow gauge railcars 
Cmbo-1 number 2672, built in 1932 at Strømmens Værksted. 56 passengers.
Cmdo Sulitelma, built in 1957 at Strømmens Værksted. 56 passengers. Transferred to the Setesdal Line after the closure of Sulitjelma Line.

Standard gauge diesel locomotives 
These locomotives are only used for shunting at areas with dual gauge track.

Skd 206 number 39, built in 1936.
Skd 206 number 44, built in 1936.

Heritage railway stations and stops 

The following stations and stops exist at the current railway museum:

Setesdal Line 1896 - 1938 
Connection with steamboat on Lake Byglandsfjorden from Byglandsfjord Station.  The railway line was closed in 1962, but parts of the railroad have been preserved. It is a current narrow-gauge heritage railroad between Røyknes and Grovane and the current standard gauged track from Grovane Station to Kristiansand Station is a part of the current Sørlandet Line. Several of the station buildings along the former railroad are still preserved.  Rail passengers had to change trains at Grovane Station from 1938 to 1962 due to different track widths, narrow-gauge to normal gauge.

Route   

 Legend
<noinclude>

See also 
 Lars Lysgaard
 Narrow gauge railways in Norway

References

External links 
Official site 
Vest-Ager Museum, Setesdal Line (Optional languages)
photos from the Setesdal Line
Google map location

Railway lines in Norway
Railway lines in Agder
Heritage railways in Norway
3 ft 6 in gauge railways in Norway
Sørlandet Line
Setesdal
Museums in Agder
Tourist attractions in Agder
Railway lines opened in 1895
1895 establishments in Norway
Railway lines closed in 1962
Museums established in 1964
1964 establishments in Norway
Vennesla
Bygland